Jamie Lynn Marchi (born October 8, 1977) is an American voice actress, ADR director and script writer who works for Funimation, and Sentai Filmworks. She has provided a number of voices for English-language versions of anime and video games. She is known for her role as Masane Amaha in Witchblade, Mari Ohara in Love Live! Sunshine!!, Mimi in Rin: Daughters of Mnemosyne, Mitsuko Kongo in A Certain Scientific Railgun, Charlotte E. Yeager in Strike Witches, Haruna Saotome in Negima!, Rias Gremory in High School DxD and Panty Anarchy in Panty & Stocking with Garterbelt.

Early life
Marchi was born in Knoxville, Tennessee, to Susan Kay Hester (née Taylor, born 1951). Her stepfather, Michael Hester (1957–2016), worked as a bio-medical engineer. She graduated from the University of Oklahoma with a bachelor's degree in theater, and started her professional acting career in 2000.

Career
Marchi got her start in voice acting in Fruits Basket as Motoko Minagawa, and has worked on and voiced for a number of American adaptations of Japanese anime series, which include Black Cat as Rinslet Walker, Soul Eater as Elizabeth "Liz" Thompson, Sekirei as Uzume, Heaven's Lost Property as Mikako Satsukitane, Panty & Stocking with Garterbelt as Panty Anarchy, A Certain Scientific Railgun as Mitsuko Kongo, Rin: Daughters of Mnemosyne as Mimi, Strike Witches as Charlotte E. Yeager, Freezing as Rana Linchen, High School DxD as Rias Gremory, Witchblade as Masane Amaha and Death Parade as Chiyuki. She also writes the anime dub scripts and directs other Funimation actors.

On October 2, 2011, Marchi made her first debut role for Fox Broadcasting Company as Background Vocals Singer in Family Guy episode Seahorse Seashell Party.

In April 2013, Marchi joined The Funimation Show web series as a co-host.

On September 3, 2015, Marchi made her debut role for Sentai Filmworks as Neko Kuroha in Brynhildr in the Darkness.

On November 3, 2017, Marchi made her first non-anime role as Green Guts in Cartoon Network's OK K.O.! Let's Be Heroes.

Legal issues 
On February 8, 2019, in response to the accusations of sexual harassment being launched at voice actor Vic Mignogna, Marchi, along with voice actress Monica Rial, tweeted their support for those speaking out against Mignogna, and shared their own alleged experiences of being sexually harassed by the actor. On April 19, she was named in a lawsuit, along with Rial, Ron Toye and Funimation, filed by Mignogna on grounds of defamation and tortious interference. On September 6, 2019, the civil case against her was dismissed and Mignogna was required to pay all of her legal fees. In February 2022, Marchi and Rial began a monthly podcast about the case.

Personal life 
Marchi's younger brother, Jean-Luc Hester, is also a voice actor.

Marchi married fellow actor Sean T. Perez on August 8, 1999. They divorced on November 21, 2005. She has two step-daughters.

Filmography

Anime

Animation

Film

Video games

Awards and nominations

Notes

References

External links

  
 
 
 

1977 births
21st-century American actresses
Actresses from Dallas
Actresses from Oklahoma
Actresses from Tennessee
American feminists
American film actresses
American writers of Italian descent
American television actresses
American video game actresses
American voice actresses
American women screenwriters
Funimation
Living people
People from Knoxville, Tennessee
People from Norman, Oklahoma
Screenwriters from Oklahoma
Screenwriters from Tennessee
Screenwriters from Texas
University of Oklahoma alumni
American voice directors
American women television writers
American television writers